M. striatus may refer to:
 Mantidactylus striatus, a frog species endemic to Madagascar
 Margarites striatus, a sea snail species

See also